Indonesia Shang Bao, is a Mandarin-language newspaper published in Indonesia. Shang Bao primarily covers business, politics, entertainment and financial news. Indonesia Shang Bao also is a daily newspaper business and finance Chinese which first published in the reform era after the collapse of the New Order government on May 12, 1998. Indonesia Shang Bao was first launched on April 17, 2000. Indonesia Shang Baos biggest partners are the Bisnis Indonesia group and Sinar Harapan newspaper.

Publications established in 2000
Chinese-language newspapers
Newspapers published in Jakarta